Time Waits for No One is the fourth solo studio album by American soul singer Mavis Staples. The album was her first on Prince's Paisley Park Records label and was released on May 24, 1989. The album includes six Prince-penned songs and two songs written by Homer Banks and Lester Snell. Shortly after this album, she continued her collaboration with Prince. In September 1989, she recorded the song "Melody Cool" which would appear in the 1990 movie Graffiti Bridge, as well as on its soundtrack, and on her 1993 follow-up album The Voice.

Track listing
All tracks composed by Prince; except where indicated

"Interesting" – 4:26
"20th Century Express" (Homer Banks, Lester Snell) – 3:52
"Come Home" – 5:21 
"Jaguar" – 5:31
"Train" – 4:25
"The Old Songs" (Homer Banks, Lester Snell) – 4:51
"I Guess I'm Crazy" – 4:12
"Time Waits for No One" (Prince, Mavis Staples) – 5:51

Personnel
Mavis Staples – vocals
Prince – all other instruments, drums, backing vocals
Sheila E. – drums, percussion, co-lead vocals on "Time Waits for No One"
Lester Snell – keyboards
Eric Leeds – saxophone
Atlanta Bliss – trumpet
Miko Weaver – guitar on "Interesting"
Boni Boyer, Dr. Fink – keyboards on "Interesting"
Levi Seacer – bass on "Interesting"
Ray Griffin – bass on "20th Century Express"
Michael Toles – guitar on "The Old Songs"
Lawrence Harper – drums on "The Old Songs"
Technical
Joe Blaney, William C. Brown III, Susan Rogers, Coke Johnson, Eddie Garcia, Sal Greco - engineer
Greg Gorman - photography

References

1989 albums
Mavis Staples albums
Albums produced by Prince (musician)
albums produced by Al Bell
Paisley Park Records albums